The Ordeal of Richard Feverel is a 1964 British period television series which originally aired on BBC 2 in four episodes from 12 September to 3 October 1964. It is an adaptation of the 1859 novel of the same title by George Meredith.

The only television adaptation produced, all four episodes are believed to still exist, although they are unavailable for public viewing.

Cast
 David Cargill as Adrian Harley
 Barry Justice as Richard Feverel 
 Hugh Burden as Sir Austin Feverel 
 Betty Hardy as Mrs. Bessy Berry
 Anna Carteret as Lucy Desborough 
 Mary Kerridge as Mrs. Doria Forey
 Barbara Lott as Lady Blandish
 Anne Castaldini as  Clare Forey 
 Adrian Ropes as Ripton Thompson
 Patrick Connor as Tom Bakewell
 Felix Felton as Hippias Feverel
 Alan Lawrance as Benson
 Annabel Barton as Mrs. Mount
 David Langton as Lord Falcon
 Francis De Wolff as Farmer Blaize
 Peter Pratt as The Hon. Peter Brayder
 Arthur Hewlett a Mr. Thompson
 Nicholas Roylance as Richard Feverel (the boy)
 Howard Knight as Ripton Thompson (the boy)
 Elizabeth Benzimra as Clare Forey (the child)
 Rachel Clay as Lucy Desborough (the child)
 Christopher Denham as Curate
 Hazel Sutton as Mignonne
 Jonathan Cecil as Giles Jinkson
 Willoughby Gray as  Sir Miles Papworth

References

Bibliography
Baskin, Ellen . Serials on British Television, 1950-1994. Scolar Press, 1996.

External links
 

BBC television dramas
1964 British television series debuts
1964 British television series endings
1960s British drama television series
1960s British television miniseries
English-language television shows
Television shows based on British novels